Calderstone Productions is the London-based subsidiary of the Universal Music Group that administers the Beatles' recorded music output that was originally owned by EMI and released on EMI's Parlophone Records (in the United Kingdom)/Capitol Records (in the United States) (1962–1968) and the Beatles' own EMI-distributed Apple Records label (1968–1970).

History
Universal Music acquired the Beatles' catalog with its 2012 purchase of EMI, along with the rights to the EMI and Capitol trademarks, and established Calderstone (initially named "Beatles Holdco Ltd.") to administer the Beatles' catalog worldwide. As part of the deal, however, Universal was required by regulators to divest its ownership of several EMI properties, most notably Parlophone, which it sold to Warner Music Group in 2013. Consequently, Calderstone currently releases Beatles recordings on the Apple label worldwide, and on Apple/Capitol in the United States, though reissues of Beatles albums originally released on the Parlophone label retain the Parlophone trademark (under license from Warner) as part of the original albums' artwork.

Calderstone also administers solo recordings by John Lennon, George Harrison, and Ringo Starr originally released on the Apple label. Paul McCartney's solo Apple recordings, however, are owned by his company MPL Communications, and are currently distributed by Universal Music's Capitol Records unit since 2016.

References

The Beatles
Universal Music Group
Companies based in London
2012 establishments in England